Pawnee Independent School District is a public school district based in the community of Pawnee, Texas (USA).

Located in Bee County, a small portion of the district extends into Karnes County.

Pawnee ISD has one school - Pawnee Elementary/Junior High - that serves students in EE through eight.

In 2009, the school district was rated "academically acceptable" by the Texas Education Agency.

History 

In 2022 the television station KRIS-TV (NBC 6) reported that allegations of retaliation had been made against the superintendent, Michelle Hartman.

References

External links
 

School districts in Bee County, Texas
School districts in Karnes County, Texas